8P/Tuttle (also known as Tuttle's Comet or Comet Tuttle) is a periodic comet with a 13.6-year orbit. It fits the classical definition of a Jupiter-family comet with an orbital period of less than 20 years, but does not fit the modern definition of (2 < TJupiter< 3). Its last perihelion passage was 27 August 2021 when it had a solar elongation of 26 degrees at approximately apparent magnitude 9.

Comet 8P/Tuttle is responsible for the Ursid meteor shower in late December.

2008 perihelion 
Under dark skies, the comet was a naked-eye object. Perihelion was late January 2008 and, as of February, was visible telescopically to Southern Hemisphere observers in the constellation Eridanus. On December 30, 2007, it was in close conjunction with spiral galaxy M33.

Predictions that the 2007 Ursid meteor shower could have possibly been stronger than usual due to the return of the comet, did not appear to materialize, as counts were in the range of normal distribution.

Contact binary 
Radar observations of Comet Tuttle in January 2008 by the Arecibo Observatory show it to be a contact binary. The comet nucleus is estimated at about 4.5 km in diameter, using the equivalent diameter of a sphere having a volume equal to the sum of a 3 km and 4 km sphere.

Additional images

References

External links 
 Orbital simulation from JPL (Java) / Horizons Ephemeris
 8P/Tuttle – Seiichi Yoshida @ aerith.net
 8P at Kronk's Cometography
 8P/Tuttle time sequence
 Comet Tuttle Seen To Be Returning
 Comet 8P/Tuttle. Canary Islands, Tenerife. 06.01.2008
 NASA Orbital Diagram

Periodic comets
0008
008P
Meteor shower progenitors
Contact binary (small Solar System body)
20210827
18580105